John Richard William Carney (22 January 1909 – 31 October 1981) was an Australian rules footballer who played with Geelong and Carlton in the Victorian Football League (VFL) during the 1930s.
  
Carney was a dashing wingman and started his league career with Geelong in 1930. Standing at just 160 cm he is the smallest player ever to represent Geelong and is said to have worn size three shoes. He was a member of Geelong's 1931 premiership side and played 79 games with the club before crossing to Carlton in 1936. He was a premiership player with Carlton in 1938 and a regular Victorian interstate representative. After ending his playing career in 1941 he became coach of the Carlton reserves team.

References

External links

Blueseum profile

1909 births
Australian rules footballers from Victoria (Australia)
Carlton Football Club players
Carlton Football Club Premiership players
Geelong Football Club players
Geelong Football Club Premiership players
Colac Football Club players
1981 deaths
Two-time VFL/AFL Premiership players